Mehmet Kurtuluş (born 27 April 1972) is a Turkish-German actor. He is best known for his work with German director Fatih Akin.

Life and career 
Kurtuluş was born in Uşak, Turkey, and moved at the age of 18 months to Germany, where he grew up with his brother, Tekin, in Salzgitter, Lower Saxony.

He performed several minor television roles in episodes of different TV shows and continued working in theater until his big-screen debut in his main role as the young Turkish boy Gabriel in Fatih Akın's film Kurz und schmerzlos (Short Sharp Shock). After his breakthrough he appeared in the successful TV mini-series The Tunnel, of Roland Suso Richter, where he performed alongside Heino Ferch and Nicolette Krebitz. Doris Dörrie chose him for her sex comedy Naked. He went back to working in television with the love film Eine Liebe in Saigon (Love in Saigon) with Luxembourgian actress Désirée Nosbusch (to whom Kurtuluş was engaged).

Kurtuluş played the main detective role in six episodes of the cult German television series Tatort. He announced afterwards that he would be working on international projects. In 2014, he co-starred with Samuel L. Jackson and Ray Stevenson in the Finnish-British action thriller Big Game.

Filmography

Film 
1996: Getürkt (Short) - Ilami
1998: Short Sharp Shock (Kurz und schmerzlos) - Gabriel
2000: In July - Isa
2001: The Tunnel - Vittorio 'Vic' Castanza
2001:  - Cem Rüya
2001: Boran - Deniz Akim
2002: Naked - Dylan
2002: Equilibrium - Search Coordinator
2003: Abdülhamit Düşerken - Sefik Bey
2004: Head-On (Gegen die Wand) - Barmann Istanbul
2004: Soundless - Sicherheitschef des Russen
2007: Pars: Kiraz operasyonu - Atilla Karahan
2009: Vasha - Artur
2010: Transfer - Laurin
2014: Big Game - Hazar
2014: Head Full of Honey - Dr. Holst
2015: Fünf Freunde 4 - Farouk
2015: 8 Seconds - Sami
2016: Tereddüt - Cem / Sehnaz's Husband
2017: Schneeflöckchen - Feuer
2019: Lady Winsley - Fergan
2019: Abikalypse - Mustis Vater

Television 
1993: Adelheid und ihre Mörder - Hassan
1995: SK-Babies - Hakan Yassin
1995: Sterne des Südens - Selçuk
1996: Doppelter Einsatz - Hakan Yassin
2004: Love in Saigon - Selçuk
2007-2012: Tatort - Cenk Batu / Cem Aslan
2015-2016: Muhteşem Yüzyıl: Kösem - Dervish Pasha
2018: The Protector - Mazhar Dragusha
2020-2022 : Into the Night - Ayaz Kobanbay

Awards 
 Locarno International Film Festival 1998: Best Actor for Short Sharp Shock
 Grimme-Preis 2001: Short Sharp Shock
 Grimme-Preis 2009: Tatort – Auf der Sonnenseite

References

External links 
 
 
 Literature of and about Mehmet Kurtuluş in the catalogue of the German National Library

1972 births
Living people
People from Uşak
German people of Turkish descent
People from Salzgitter
Turkish male film actors
German male film actors
German male television actors
Turkish emigrants to Germany
20th-century German male actors
21st-century German male actors